Alec Snow (born May 26, 1945) is a businessperson and former politician in Labrador. He represented Menihek in the Newfoundland House of Assembly from 1989 to 1996.

He was born in Millertown Junction, was educated in Grand Falls and moved to Labrador in 1964, working for the Iron Ore Company of Canada for 10 years. He opened his own business in 1973. Snow was a member of the town council for Labrador City, also serving as mayor. He married Anita Lannon; the couple had two children.

He was elected to the Newfoundland and Labrador assembly in 1989 and was elected in 1993. Snow was defeated by Perry Canning when he ran for election in the new riding of Labrador West in 1996. In 2005, he was named to the province's Business Advisory Board.

References 

Progressive Conservative Party of Newfoundland and Labrador MHAs
Mayors of places in Newfoundland and Labrador
Living people
1945 births